The Young Liberals (JuLis), is a political youth organisation in Germany. It is the financially and organisationally independent youth wing of the Free Democratic Party (FDP).  The JuLis claim about 13,000 members, making it the third largest youth organisation in Germany.

Political profile

The current policy statement of the JuLis was passed in 2008. It is a revision of the policy statement of 1994, and is called "Humanistic Liberalism - thought for the future". It focuses on the market economy and civil liberties, being supplemented by the democratic resolutions of regular congresses.

The political objectives of the JuLis mostly aim to the same general objectives as the FDP, however they often differ in details. The Young Liberals advocate civil liberties, sociopolitics and an ecologically sustainable social market economy. The JuLis focus on political freedom, self-responsibility, equal opportunity, deregulation and reducing the state's influence to its core competences such as the prevention from economic cartels.

The Young Liberals often perceive themselves as the policy making stimulus of the FDP and try to propose innovations into the party, sometimes succeeding e.g. in the FDP's decision to challenge the abandonment of the German compulsory military service, to support of the concept of an ecologically-sustainable social market economy, and replacement of existing social welfare benefits with a basic income called Bürgergeld.

History
The JuLis were founded in 1980, and was recognized as the official FDP youth wing in 1983. Prior to 1982, Jungdemokraten (Young Democrats) had been the FDP youth organisation.

Persons

Chairpersons
Hans-Joachim Otto (1980–1983)
Guido Westerwelle (1983–1988)
Georg Neubauer (1988–1989)
Hermann Brem (1989)
Birgit Homburger (1990–1993)
Ralph Lange (1993–1995)
Michael Kauch (1995–1999)
Daniel Bahr (1999–2004)
Jan Dittrich (2004–2005)
Johannes Vogel (2005–2010)
Lasse Becker (2010–2013)
Alexander Hahn (2013–2014)
Konstantin Kuhle (2014–2018)
Ria Schröder (2018–2020)
Jens Teutrine (2020–2021)
Franziska Brandmann (2021–)

International relations
The JuLis is a full member organisation of the European Liberal Youth (LYMEC), a pan-European umbrella of liberal youth organisations. 
On the international level, the JuLis are the German member of the International Federation of Liberal Youth (IFLRY).

References

External links
Young Liberals (JuLis) official site (in German)
Program and resolutions (in German)

Youth wings of liberal parties
Youth wings of political parties in Germany
Free Democratic Party (Germany)